"Everything I'm Not" is the second single released from Australian musical duo the Veronicas' debut album, The Secret Life of... (2005). It reached number seven on the ARIA Singles Charts and has been certified gold over 35,000 units shipped in Australia.

Critical reception
Kelefa Sanneh from The New York Times named it amongst some of the excellent songs on the album, calling it "[...] loud [and] melancholy[...]". Preston Jones from Slant Magazine stated that it felt "[...] like the estrogenically inclined counterparts to the boy-toy confection that is the Click Five's Greetings From Imrie House." Ryan Dombal from Entertainment Weekly reviewed the remix version of "Everything I'm Not", stating that the track might finally break them into the US mainstream.

Release and chart performance
"Everything I'm Not" was released in Australia on 21 November 2005. The song made its debut on the chart on issue date 4 December 2005 at number 13. After a steady climb up the charts for eight weeks, the song peaked at number seven on 22 January 2006, where it stayed for one week before descending the top 50. The single was certified gold with shipments of over 7,500 copies. In New Zealand, the single made its chart debut at number 10 and remained on the chart for nine weeks, its last position at number 21. In Europe, "Everything I'm Not" peaked at number 14 on Flanders' Ultratip chart at number three.

Live performances
The Veronicas performed "Everything I'm Not" on television shows such as Dancing With the Stars, The Panel, Sunrise, Live at the Chapel and the 2006 ARIA Music Awards.
They also performed live recordings of the song on Sessions@AOL and in 2009 they performed the song on UK radio station Capital FM to promote the single's release.
On 10 September 2009, they performed the song live at the Oxford Art Factory on Oxford Street in Paddington, Sydney as part of the MasterCard's Priceless Music Events.

Music video
The "Everything I'm Not" music video features the Veronicas singing with their band while trashing a car of an ex-boyfriend, apparently named Ryan, for cheating on Lisa by painting and smashing the car with paint buckets while the ex-boyfriend looks on from a video camera. When it is too much for the ex-boyfriend to handle, he drops his cell phone on the ground. In the end, it seems like the police catch them doing it and they slam down the camera, smashing the ex-boyfriend's chances of seeing his car for the final time.

Track listings

 Australian CD single
 "Everything I'm Not" – 3:22
 "4ever" (Claude le Gache extended vocal) – 7:16
 "4ever" (Mac Quayle Break Mix) – 7:17

 European CD single
 "Everything I'm Not" – 3:22
 "4ever" (Claude le Gache extended vocal) – 7:16

 Digital download EP
 "Everything I'm Not" (Jason Nevins Remix edit) – 3:31
 "Everything I'm Not" (Claude Le Gache edit) – 3:59
 "Everything I'm Not" (Claude Le Gache Mixshow) – 6:02

 Digital download EP (DJ version)
 "Everything I'm Not" (Jason Nevins extended mix) – 6:12
 "Everything I'm Not" (Jason Nevins Electromagnetic dub) – 6:13
 "Everything I'm Not" (Claude Le Gache club mix) – 7:08
 "Everything I'm Not" (Eddie Beez Mix) – 8:57

 iTunes EP
 "Everything I'm Not" – 3:22
 "Everything I'm Not" (Claude le Gache Mixshow) – 6:02
 "4ever" (E Smoove club)
 "4ever" (Claude le Gache dub)
 "Everything I'm Not" (video)

Charts

Weekly charts

Year-end charts

Sales and certifications

Release history

References

External links
 Watch the music video to "Everything I'm Not"

The Veronicas songs
2005 singles
2005 songs
Music videos directed by Robert Hales
Sire Records singles
Song recordings produced by Dr. Luke
Song recordings produced by Max Martin
Song recordings produced by Rami Yacoub
Songs written by Dr. Luke
Songs written by Jessica Origliasso
Songs written by Lisa Origliasso
Songs written by Max Martin
Songs written by Rami Yacoub